Phyllis Randolph Frye is an Associate Judge for the Municipal Courts in the US city of Houston, Texas. Frye is the first openly transgender judge appointed in the world.

Biography
Phyllis Frye, born circa 1946, is a transgender woman. She was born in San Antonio, Texas.

In her younger years, she earned the rank of Eagle Scout, and was a member of the Junior Reserve Officers' Training Corps. Frye attended Texas A&M University  where she graduated with a B.S. in Civil Engineering and an M.S. in Mechanical Engineering. While at Texas A&M, Frye was a member of the university's Corps of Cadets, belonged to the Texas A&M Singing Cadets.

Frye joined the United States Army and post graduation at Texas A&M she was stationed in West Germany as a lieutenant. Frye disclosed her struggles with her sexual identity to her Army superiors where they sent her back to the United States with an effort to be "cured". These efforts included drug therapy, hypnosis, and aversion therapy. When these attempts all failed her wife filed for divorce. She was honorably discharged from the Army in 1972 after being forced to resign.

After her discharge from the Army she hit a low point in her life and attempted suicide. She used this event to turn her life around. She began working as a civil engineer, became a born-again Christian, and also met her second wife, Trish.

Frye held a job at Texas A&M University, but was dismissed after rumors made their way to her department chairman. She and her wife moved to Pennsylvania for a short time and where she found a new job. In 1977 she was rejected from a government job due to her "disruptive influence in her community".

She transitioned in 1976 around the age of 30, electing some medical procedures and foregoing others. Around this time she also won the right to amend her birth certificate.

Fry earned an M.B.A. and J.D. from the University of Houston.  She found herself felt completely isolated so she requested seating charts for all her classes and memorized her classmates' names and approached them individually. During her time at the University of Houston she joined the Christian Legal Society - but eventually got the group suspended for discrimination because they were secretly meeting to avoid letting her be involved. While at law school she underwent feminizing hormone therapy and electrolysis leaving her going through substantial physical changes.

After graduation, Frye could not find a firm that would hire her, so she sold Amway cleaning products and worked sporadically as an engineering consultant. She took an interest in criminal defense and became a recognizable fixture in the Harris County Courthouse.

Frye politically aligns as a Democrat and was active with the state Democrats, the League of Women Voters, and the local gay and lesbian caucus - where she developed a working relationship with Annise Parker. Parker and Frye had been friends for three decades, having met on a lesbian softball league. and Frye became the first transgender woman in Houston's lesbian softball league.

Frye became the country's first openly transgender judge - after being discriminated against heavily in both a private and public sphere ranging from people vandalizing her house to refusing her jobs.

Career
Frye presented at her first Creating Change conference (trans and bisexual caucuses combined meeting) in 1995.

A dispute arose over the version of the Employment Non-Discrimination Act (ENDA) proposed in the 104th Congress (1995–1996), which did not include protection for transgender people.  The Human Rights Campaign (HRC), an LGBT advocacy group, drew particular criticism for its endorsement of the Act, which was seen as a betrayal by many in the transgender community.  In February 1997 Frye organized a gathering of transgender people in Washington, D.C. where 20 people came to the offices of 46 senators of the 49 who voted for ENDA in 1996 to discuss the vote and advocate for expanding the protections to include the transgender community.  Their efforts seemed moot.

By the 2000s Frye was representing more and more transgender clients in name-change and discrimination cases.

On November 17, 2010, Houston mayor Annise Parker appointed Frye as an Associate Judge for the City of Houston Municipal Courts.  Her appointment was publicly opposed by the Houston Area Pastors Council and other local pastors, but Mayor Parker expressed admiration for Frye, citing the new judge's long experience as a trial attorney.  The Houston City Council unanimously approved of her appointment. On April 28, 2013, Frye was presented with the Lifetime Achievement Award by the Transgender Foundation of America.

See also
 List of first women lawyers and judges in the United States
 List of LGBT jurists in the United States

References

External links
 
Phyllis Frye Collection (Digital Transgender Archive)

Living people
Texas A&M University alumni
LGBT appointed officials in the United States
LGBT judges
LGBT lawyers
LGBT people from Texas
Texas lawyers
Transgender women
Transgender law in the United States
Transgender military personnel
Year of birth missing (living people)